Cryptolithus is a genus of extinct trinucleid trilobites that lived during the Ordovician period. They were mostly blind. They are found in the United States, Canada, Venezuela, the United Kingdom, France, the Czech Republic, Morocco and Turkey.

Species 
Valid species of Cryptolithus include:

 Cryptolithus bellulus (Ulrich, 1879)
 Cryptolithus carimatus
 Cryptolithus fittsi (Ulrich & Whittington)
 Cryptolithus goldfussi (Barrande)
 Cryptolithus inopinatus (Whittard)
 Cryptolithus intertetus (Whittard)
 Cryptolithus lorerainensis (Ruedemann)
 Cryptolithus lorettensis (Foerste, 1924)
 Cryptolithus ornatus (Sternberg)
 Cryptolithus portlockii 
 Cryptolithus portlockii girvanensis
 Cryptolithus quadrillatus
 Cryptolithus recurvus (Ulrich, 1919)
 Cryptolithus tessellatus (Green, 1832)
 Cryptolithus ultimus (Barrande)

References

Trinucleidae
Asaphida genera